Marion's Piazza is a pizzeria chain based in Dayton, Ohio. Established in 1965 by Marion Glass, the company operates nine restaurants throughout the greater Dayton area. Marion's son, Roger Glass, took over as CEO after Marion's death in 2006 and continued to manage the company until his passing in August of 2022.

The pizzeria produces what it calls "Dayton-style pizza". In 2017, it was recognized by the trade publication Pizza Today, as the number one independent pizza chain based on sales. Roger Glass, the CEO, noted that the company won the award four of the last five years.

History 
The company was founded on August 19, 1965 by Marion Glass. Glass was an owner of three franchises for the larger Dayton-area Cassano's Pizza King chain. Glass said he wanted his own restaurant because he wanted to offer a dining-room experience as opposed to the mostly delivery and carry-out options.

His departure from Cassano's came a year after what the Dayton Daily News dubbed the "pizza wars". A fellow franchisee, Ron Holp, broke off and opened his own restaurant, which led to a lawsuit between Holp and Cassano's, in which Holp was accused of stealing pizza dough from the company. After Holp won the case, Glass asked if he could buy dough for Marion's. While Holp would not sell it, his wife showed Glass how to make the dough.

1965 price promotions 
Every 5 years, for one day only, Marion's Piazza sells their traditional menu items at the original 1965 price (e.g., a small cheese pizza for $0.80 and a large deluxe pizza for $2.50).

Kenley Players cast parties 
One of the distinct characteristics of every Marion's Piazza location is the photos found on the walls. From 1966 to 1995, the Kenley Players would hold cast parties at Marion's after their summer theatre performances. Today, the walls are filled with black and white photographs of the parties. Many of the photos are autographed by the celebrities. The photographs include celebrities such as Paul Lynde, Desi Arnaz, Jr., Sandy Duncan, Sally Field, McLean Stevenson, Barry Williams, Gary Sandy, Loni Anderson, Robert Goulet, Mickey Rooney, William Shatner, Tim Conway, Morgan Fairchild, Dom DeLuise, Joyce DeWitt, Billy Crystal, Bill Bixby, Karla DeVito, Rip Taylor, and George Hamilton among others. The photos serve as memorial of Marion's tradition in the Dayton area.

See also 
 St. Louis-style pizza – similar to Marion's square-slice pizza

References

External links 
 

Companies based in Dayton, Ohio
Pizza chains of the United States
Regional restaurant chains in the United States
Restaurants in Ohio
Restaurants established in 1965
1965 establishments in Ohio